The following is the complete list of the 197 Virtual Console titles that have been released for the Nintendo 3DS in the PAL region (Europe and Australia) sorted by system and release dates.

Available titles
The following is the complete list of the 187 Virtual Console titles available for the Nintendo 3DS in the PAL region (Europe and Australia) sorted by system and release dates.

Game Boy
There are 49 games available to purchase.

Game Boy Color
There are 29 games available to purchase.

Game Gear
There are 16 games available to purchase.

Nintendo Entertainment System
There are 63 games available to purchase.

Super Nintendo Entertainment System
There are 31 games available to purchase on the New Nintendo 3DS platforms (New Nintendo 3DS, New Nintendo 3DS XL or New Nintendo 2DS XL).

Delisted
There is 1 game which was previously available for purchase, but is not anymore.

Game Boy

Promotion-exclusive titles
The following is the complete list of the 10 Virtual Console titles which were available for the Nintendo 3DS in the PAL region (Europe and Australia) exclusively by special promotion, sorted by system and release dates.

Game Boy Advance
There are 10 games which were promotion-exclusive. These are the 10 Game Boy Advance games that were available exclusively for Nintendo 3DS Ambassadors, which have been stated to have no planned public release.

See also
List of Virtual Console games for Wii (PAL region)
List of Virtual Console games for Wii U (PAL region)
List of Nintendo 3DS games
List of DSiWare games and applications
List of DSiWare games (PAL region)
3D Classics

References

Video game lists by platform
Nintendo-related lists